Arena is a 1953 Ansco Color 3-D film directed by Richard Fleischer and starring Gig Young, Jean Hagen, and Polly Bergen. It was promoted as "the first 3-D Western" of the era.

Plot
A man named Hob Danvers comes to a Tucson, Arizona rodeo with Sylvia Lorgan in tow. Hob has been separated from wife Ruth for two years, and doesn't realize she intends to be at the rodeo.

He meets up with old friends Lew and Meg Hutchins and learns that Lew is here looking for work. He is shocked to find that Lew is now a clown, after many years as a rodeo rider.

Current rodeo star Jackie Roach turns up and makes a pass at Sylvia, who rejects him. Hob competes in bareback riding and so impresses Lew's young son that Lew bribes a cowboy to change places and let him ride a bucking bronco. Lew is thrown and badly injures his leg.

Ruth scolds the others for encouraging Lew, saying everyone should face the hard truth that his rodeo career is done. Lew, angry now, enters the Brahma bull competition over Meg's objections. Hob goes first and is thrown. Lew, attempting to distract the bull, cannot get away quickly enough due to his bad leg. He is fatally gored. Hob walks away, leaving Sylvia behind, but Ruth joins him on the way out.

Cast
 Gig Young as Hob Danvers
 Jean Hagen as Meg
 Polly Bergen as Ruth
 Harry Morgan as Lew Hutchins
 Barbara Lawrence as Sylvia
 Robert Horton as Jack Roach

Reception
According to MGM records the film earned $762,000 in the US and Canada and $260,000 elsewhere, resulting in a profit of $444,000.

References

External links
 
 
 
 

Films directed by Richard Fleischer
1953 films
American 3D films
American Western (genre) films
1953 3D films
1953 Western (genre) films
Metro-Goldwyn-Mayer films
Rodeo in film
Films set in Tucson, Arizona
1953 drama films
1950s English-language films
1950s American films